Soul Reggae is the debut album by Beres Hammond, released in 1976.

Track listing

"You Don't Have to Lie"
"Oh Take Me Girl"
"My Whole World"
"Don't Wait Too Long"
"Somebody Lied"
"Is This the Right Way?"
"I'll Never Change"
"Got to Get Away"
"Smile"
"Your Love Won't Shine"
"One Step Ahead"

Personnel
Beres Hammond - vocals
Clarence Wears, Robert Johnson, Willie Lindo - guitar
Art McLead, Val Douglas - bass
Michael Richards - drums
Tyrone Downie, Harold Butler, Earl "Wire" Lindo, Robert Lyn - keyboards
Cedric Brooks - congas 
Carlton Samuels, Cedric Brooks, Glen DaCosta - saxophone
David Maden, Jackie Willacy, Nathan Breckenridge - trumpet
Joe McCormack - trombone
Jackie Willacy - flugelhorn
Cynthia Richards, Cynthia Schloss, Ernest Wilson, Merlyn Brooks - background vocals

1976 debut albums
Beres Hammond albums